Joseph Lofthouse Jr. (1880–1962) was an Anglican bishop in the 20th century.

Lofthouse was born on 17 March 1880. He was educated at the University of Toronto and ordained in 1907. He was Incumbent of St James' Rainy River then a canon of St Alban's Pro-Cathedral, Keewatin, then a domestic and examining chaplain to the Bishop of Keewatin and Archdeacon of Kenora before succeeding him in 1938.

Lofthouse retired in 1953 and died on 13 July 1962.

See also
Joseph Lofthouse

References

1880 births
1962 deaths
20th-century Anglican Church of Canada bishops
University of Toronto alumni
Anglican archdeacons in North America
Anglican bishops of Keewatin